Gaetbulibacter jejuensis is a Gram-negative, rod-shaped, strictly aerobic and non-motile bacterium from the genus of Gaetbulibacter which has been isolated from seawater from the coast of the Jeju Island.

References

Flavobacteria
Bacteria described in 2010